Giuseppe Marc'Antonio Baretti (24 April 1719, Turin, Piedmont – 5 May 1789, London) was an Italian literary critic, poet, writer, translator, linguist and author of two influential language-translation dictionaries. During his years in England he was often known as Joseph Baretti. Baretti's life was marked by controversies, to the point that he had to leave Italy, for England, where he remained for the rest of his life.

Biography
Baretti was intended by his father for the profession of law, but at the age of sixteen fled from Turin and went to Guastalla, where he was for some time employed in a mercantile house. He devoted himself to the study of literature and criticism, in which he became an expert, though his writings were so controversial that he had to leave Italy. For many years he led a wandering life, supporting himself chiefly by his writings. At length he arrived in London, where he remained for the remainder of his life (when not travelling). He was appointed Secretary to the Royal Academy of Arts, and became acquainted with Samuel Johnson, Garrick and others of that society.

Baretti was a frequent visitor at the home of Hester Thrale, and his name occurs repeatedly in Boswell's Life. In 1769 Baretti was tried for murder after inflicting a mortal wound with his fruit knife on a man who had assaulted him on the street. Johnson and others gave evidence in his favour at the trial, which resulted in Baretti's acquittal.

He died in London in May, 1789. He was buried in Marylebone Chapel with a monument by Thomas Banks.

Works
Baretti's first notable work was the Italian Library (1757), a useful catalogue of the lives and works of several Italian authors. The Lettere famigliari, giving an account of his travels through England, Portugal, Spain, and France during the years 1761–1765, were well received, and when afterwards published in English (4 vols., 1770), were highly commended by Johnson.

Baretti was an enemy of the English Hispanist John Bowle, and published a scathing and personal attack on him: Tolondron. Speeches to John Bowle about his edition of Don Quixote, together with some account of Spanish literature.

While in Italy on his travels Baretti started a journal of literary criticism, titled Frusta letteraria (Literary Scourge). The publication met with considerable difficulties and was soon discontinued. His many other works include a Dictionary and Grammar of the Italian Language, a similar Dictionary of the Spanish Language, and dissertations on Shakespeare and Voltaire. His collected works were published at Milan in 1838.

The words of the recantation attributed to Galileo, "eppur si muove" (meaning "nevertheless it moves"), were first set down by Baretti in his Italian Library.  This record was published some 125 years after Galileo is purported to have made the statement sotto voce (under his breath).

Murder trial

On 6 October 1769, Baretti was involved in a scuffle at the Haymarket, an area which was notorious as a place of prostitution and frequented by footpads, with many coffeehouses and shops. This quarrel caused the death of a man, Evan Morgan. In a trial at the Old Bailey on 18 October 1769, Baretti was accused of having stabbed Morgan and was charged with murder.

Being a wealthy man, Baretti did not have to suffer very unpleasant conditions. After having been heard by Sir John Fielding, he had been sent to Tothill Fields Bridewell till they could gather more information about the conditions of Evan Morgan, who died the day following the scuffle. Baretti did not walk to the prison, instead a coach was called and once there he paid for a private room, where he had also some food and drinks. This was not the case of ordinary poor people, who normally had to suffer much worse and primitive treatments, being pushed into an overcrowded cell, without much provision.

In this trial, Baretti was called with the English name Joseph. Being Italian, he had the right to be tried by a jury of half foreigners, which he refused, as we read from the first lines of The Proceedings, so that he was normally tried by a jury of Englishmen, thus demonstrating intentionally his regard towards the English justice.

It is necessary to consider that most information about the trial come from The Proceedings, a publication which from 1664 to 1913 took note and told all (or at least most) of the trials which took place at the Old Bailey. However, in these accounts and transcriptions of what was said in court we do not find everything. Many details are missing, therefore these are not to be intended as fully and complete accounts of trials.

Prosecution testimonies 
The trial opened with the testimony of Elizabeth Ward, a well-known prostitute who described when and where the events started. Following her own account, in the evening on 6 October 1769, between nine and ten, she was sitting down on a step together with another woman in the Haymarket, when the other woman approached Baretti, who was passing through there, and Ward said she thought the other woman had touched him. Ward then accused him of having struck her. She said in that moment there was nobody around, but when she cried out three men arrived, namely Evan Morgan, Thomas Patman and John Clark. One of them asked Baretti how he could strike a woman and then a scuffle followed, Baretti ending up on the ground. Ward saw Baretti take out his knife, but she did not see him using it. She also said that then Baretti ran away and they ran after him. She saw him going into a shop in Panton Street. 
In cross-examination she was asked to give more information about the woman who was with her and Ward said she did not know her, but could only describe her physically. She was asked also more and more details, for example where the other woman put her hands when grabbing Baretti, and she answered she put them towards his private parts. 
This was possible because eighteenth-century breeches had some slits on the side, and prostitutes often tried to slip a hand as a way of attracting a possible client.
She added she did not know the three men who arrived, but that she remembered having kissed one of them (namely Clark) the night before. The court asked if Baretti had been insulted, she firstly denied, then seemed to be unsure, and added at the end that maybe somebody called him bad names, but she did not know who.

The second person to testify was Thomas Patman, one of the three men who came up at the Haymarket. He told the court he was with the other two men that evening, they had been drinking together and then decided to go to Golden Square, but when they were in the Haymarket they saw a gentleman, meaning Baretti, striking Elisabeth Ward. Patman said he was pushed against Baretti, who gave him a stab wound: "I received a blow from him directly on my left side: the blood ran down into my shoe". He denied any insult or offense to Baretti. He said also that Morgan ran after Baretti and was struck by him too. In cross-examination he was asked about the stabbing he received.

John Clark was the next to speak and confirmed the version of Patman. In particular he was asked about the stabbings, how, when, where they happened and he claimed Morgan was stabbed in Panton Street. However, there seemed to be some inconsistencies about when it happened: during the trial Clark said Morgan was stabbed after Patman, but during the examination by the magistrate and coroner he had said Morgan was the first to be stabbed. He then also added that someday then collared Baretti and he stated he thought it was Morgan himself. About his having kissed Ward the night before, he claimed he never saw the woman before.

John Lambert testified as he was the constable who apprehended Baretti. In eighteenth-century England there was not a police force in the terms we intend it today and Baretti was actually apprehended by a constable. These were ordinary men whose job was to prevent crime and to arrest people suspected of felony by taking them to a justice of the peace. Lambert said he was having dinner that night when he heard the cry of "murderer" or "stop murderer" and saw a man pursued by other two or three going into the grocer's shop opposite his house. He went there and saw Patman had blood on him and heard him say he had been stabbed by Baretti. In the meanwhile a crowd gathered and Lambert asked Baretti to surrender. He then said he thought of carrying Baretti to the round-house, but hearing the name of John Fielding Baretti expressed his will to go to him. In cross-examinations Lambert confirmed that Baretti did not try to escape nor to conceal the knife. He added that he himself also tried to find the other prostitute at the Haymarket responsible for having importuned Baretti, but could not.

Finally, it was the turn of two patients and a surgeon, who were at the hospital when Patman and Morgan were brought there. John Llyod and Robert Lelcock were two patients who were in Middlesex hospital that night and they were told the story by Morgan, the victim. Morgan told them he had been stabbed thrice and this was then confirmed by the doctor, John Wyatt. The surgeon said that Morgan's death was caused by the abdomen wound and he again recollected the sequence of the events, as they were narrated to him.

In the prosecution testimonies there are many cross-examinations, each witness was actually further inquired. However, it is not clear who did this, it could have been Baretti himself, the judge or even a lawyer. Shoemaker pointed out that prosecution lawyers first appeared at the Old Bailey in around the 1730s, followed almost immediately by lawyers for the defence, so by the time Baretti was prosecuted there might have been one of them present in the court. Moreover, it is necessary to consider that for most eighteenth-century interventions of lawyers are not reported or are unclear in The Proceedings. The possibility that Baretti had a lawyer who carried out all the cross-examinations we read in the trial transcription is therefore not to be excluded.

Defence testimonies

After having heard different versions of the facts of the prosecution testimonies, the court let Baretti defend himself and he took the chance to read a text he had previously prepared and written in his defence. He started by narrating the facts of that day. He had spent his day at home working, correcting his Italian and English dictionary and then after 4 pm he went to the club of the Royal Academicians in Soho and he went on explaining his other movements, up until he got to the Haymarket. He said he was passing near there when he saw a woman, who firstly asked him for a glass of wine and then clapped his hand on his genitals with violence, hurting him very much. He also said there might have been two women, as other testimonies claimed, but he only saw one: "They say there were two, but I took notice of but one, as I hope God will save me: there might have been two, though I only saw one: that is a fact". Therefore, he stroke her hand and the woman insulted him for being a foreigner, he said "she called me several bad names [...] among which French bugger, d-ed Frenchman, and a woman-hater, were the most audible". By then he was going away when a man struck him with a fist, asking him how he dared strike a woman. He was beat by them and other people who surrounded him, but found a way to escape, even if they then caught him. When he later managed to get into a grocer's shop to find protection, he said he was grateful for the arrival of the constable and other people who gathered there. He said he then went to Fieldings and he also described his several wounds and bruises on his face and body.

Having concluded his own account of the facts, Baretti turned to the jury saying "I hope your Lordship, and every person present, will think that a man of my age, character and way of life, would not spontaneously quit my pen, to engage in an outrageous insult." And finally he explained his short-sight as a possible cause for not having seen the other woman. As for what regards his carrying a knife with him, he said as justification: "I wear it to carve fruit and sweetmeats, and not to kill my fellow-creature" – it was a common custom in France where people did not use to put knives on tables, and ladies too carried them in their pockets. Moreover, he explained his refusal to be tried by a jury of half foreigners, saying that he did for his life and for his honour, "I chose to be tried by a Jury of this country; for if my honour is not saved, I cannot much wish for the preservation of my life". In this way he concluded his speech, showing he trusted England's law system and with the confidence that he would have been acquitted, as he believed he had the right to.

As we read in The Proceedings the next to testify was a passer-by, Ann Thomas, who told the story and what she saw. She was apparently the only eye-witness testifying in the trial and said she was in Panton Street with her child when she saw a group of people at the end of the street by the Haymarket and said she "saw a gentleman run from among them on the side of the way I was [...] they all ran after him: they were all in a great bustle". She did not add much information and she seemed to be unsure about how many men there were.

What we find next are a series of testimonies of Baretti's friends or acquaintances, who all testify for him. The first to talk were Mr. Peter Molini and Mr. Low, who said they saw themselves the night following the scuffle the bruises on Baretti's body, on his back, shoulders, cheek and jaw. They also affirmed it was common for them too, to use and carry knives such as the one Baretti had, confirming in this way the explanation Baretti had previously given.

Other gentlemen commented upon the Haymarket, describing it as an unsafe place to go. Justice Kelnynge and Mr. Perrin stated it was a place "impossible to walk up [...] in the evening" because of the indecent women you could find there and Kelnynge said that a similar episode happened to him as well before. Major Alderton added that around the Haymarket aggressions happened frequently.

There were then many witnesses which testified to Baretti's good character and quiet lifestyle. Hon. Mr. Beauclerck described him as a gentleman of letters and a studious man. Sir Joshua Reynolds said he was a man with great humanity and "very active in endeavouring his friends", he outlined his sober disposition, saying that he never drank more than three glasses with him and he added: "I never heard of his being in passions or quarreling". Doctor Johnson described him as very diligent and peaceable, a man who did not frequent prostitutes. Edmund Burke claimed he was an ingenious man, "a man of remarkable humanity; a thorough good-natured man", whereas David Garrick said of him he was a man of great probity and morals.

As we read from The Proceedings there were other several gentlemen who were there to testify for Baretti's good character, but the court did not think it necessary to call them all. Baretti did not only have a lot of people who were willing to testify for him, but these were also all eminent people of the time.

This trial is reported in Hitchcock and Shoemaker's book Tales from the Hanging Court as an example of how important were testimonies of friends and neighbours, who could assert for the good character of the accused. Defendants usually tried to call them to testify, to account of the accused good behaviour, quiet ways etc. These testimonies could influence a lot the perception of the accused person and also affect the jury's verdict and their choice of the punishment.

Verdict
Evan Morgan died at the Middlesex hospital the day after the quarrel took place. The death was caused by one of the three wounds Baretti gave him with his knife. Baretti could have been sentenced to death, as the felony he was accused of was murder, which led to capital punishment. However, Baretti was found not guilty and acquitted, as his action was considered self-defence.

Baretti was extremely satisfied with the outcome of the trial, in particular with the kind demonstration of affection he received from his friends, so much that he felt himself even more connected with England than before, a country which had given him justice and real friendship. He later revealed to his friend Lord Charlemont that "those I had about me did their part so well that they have made me an Englishman forever".

Notes

References

Hitchcock T., Shoemaker R., (2007),Tales from the Hanging Court, Hodder Education

External links

Guide to Giuseppe Marco Antonio Baretti letters at Houghton Library, Harvard University
Account of the full trial on the Old Bailey Online
Locating London's Past website: to locate places of eighteenth-century London

1719 births
1789 deaths
Writers from Turin
Streathamites
People from the Kingdom of Sardinia
Italian emigrants to the Kingdom of Great Britain
18th-century Italian writers
18th-century Italian male writers
18th-century British writers
Italian-language poets